Sándor Wladár (born 19 July 1963 in Budapest) is a Hungarian retired male swimmer. He won the gold medal at the 1980 Summer Olympics in Moscow in 200 m backstroke.

Wladár was a swimmer of Központi Sportiskola (1972–1980), Újpesti Dózsa (1981–1985). From 1985 to 1987 he was a water polo player for Újpesti Dózsa.

He was named the Male European Swimmer of the Year in 1981 by Swimming World magazine. The same year he was elected Hungarian Sportsman of the year.

After retiring from active sport he opened a veterinarian clinic with his brother Zoltán who was also a swimmer.

Wladár was elected president of the Hungarian Swimming Association (MÚSZ) on 24 September 2017.

Achievements 
 World Championships
 Silver medal in 1982 (200 m backstroke)
 European Championships
 Gold medal in 1981 (100 m backstroke)
 Gold medal in 1981 (200 m backstroke)
 Silver Medal in 1983 (200 m backstroke)

References

External links
 

1963 births
Living people
Male backstroke swimmers
Olympic swimmers of Hungary
Swimmers at the 1980 Summer Olympics
Swimmers from Budapest
Olympic gold medalists for Hungary
World Aquatics Championships medalists in swimming
European Aquatics Championships medalists in swimming
European champions for Hungary
Medalists at the 1980 Summer Olympics
Olympic gold medalists in swimming
Hungarian veterinarians